The 2007–08 All-Ireland Intermediate Club Hurling Championship was the fourth staging of the All-Ireland Intermediate Club Hurling Championship since its establishment made by the Gaelic Athletic Association in 2004.

The All-Ireland final was played on 9 February 2008 at Croke Park in Dublin, between Clonkill from Westmeath and Tommy Larkin’s from Galway. Clonkill won the match by 4-15 to 3-14 to become the first Westmeath club to win an All-Ireland title.

Results

Leinster Intermediate Club Hurling Championship

Final

Munster Intermediate Club Hurling Championship

Quarter-finals

Semi-finals

Final

All-Ireland Intermediate Club Hurling Championship

Final

Championship statistics

Miscellaneous

 Clonkill became the first club from Westmeath to win an All-Ireland title in any grade of hurling.

References

All-Ireland Intermediate Club Hurling Championship
All-Ireland Intermediate Club Hurling Championship
All-Ireland Intermediate Club Hurling Championship